The women's pole vault event at the 2003 IAAF World Indoor Championships was held on March 15–16.

Medalists

Results

Qualification
Qualification: Qualification Performance 4.35 (Q) or at least 8 best performers advanced to the final.

Final

References
Results

Pole
Pole vault at the World Athletics Indoor Championships
2003 in women's athletics